Pisamira is a Tucanoan language. Ethnologue misidentifies it as a dialect of Tucano.

Phonology 
Pisamira features six vowels /a e i ɨ o u/ which can be either oral or nasal, and eleven consonant phonemes. A few of these consonants /g, t͡ʃ, r/ have a restricted distribution and rarely or never appear at the beginnings of roots.

References

Languages of Colombia
Tucanoan languages